Allegory: A Tapestry of Guru Nanak's Travels is a 24 episode multilingual docuseries, directed by Amardeep Singh and Vininder Kaur. The docuseries documents various multi-faith sites across 9 countries which were visited by Guru Nanak, the first Sikh Guru, during his travels in the 16th century.

Production 
The docuseries was filmed in nine different countries; Sri Lanka, Iran, Pakistan, Afghanistan, Tibet (China), Iraq, Saudi Arabia, Bangladesh and India, and covered more than 150 multi-faith sites. Initially, the docuseries was intended to be completed in one year but it took more than three years to finish.

The series has been produced in English and Punjabi languages with the production cost of approximately $2 million. There are plans to produce the Hindi, Shahmukhi and Urdu versions of the series as well.

Online release 
The 24 episode series in English is available on the TheGuruNanak.com website. The episodes were released on a weekly basis starting from 14 October 2021. 

The Punjabi version titled Sainat, Guru Nanak Dey Paindeyan Di Roohani Chaap is also being released on the website on a weekly basis from 11 May 2022.

Reception 
The series received more than 500,000 views on the website from September 2021 till June 2022.

References

External links 

 Complete docuseries on TheGuruNanak.com
 ALLEGORY, A Tapestry of Guru Nanak’s Travels link on IMDb

2020s Punjabi-language films